Massachusetts ballot measures may refer to:

 Massachusetts 2008 ballot measures
 Massachusetts 2012 ballot measures